Kolol (also known as Kulal and Kūlol) is a village in Ziarat Rural District, in the Central District of Dashtestan County, Bushehr Province, Iran. At the 2016 census, its population was 616, in 128 families.

References 

Populated places in Dashtestan County